KOAK (1080 AM) is a commercial radio station serving the Red Oak, Iowa area.  The station primarily broadcasts a country music format.  KOAK is licensed to Hawkeye Communications, Inc as a daytime-only station.  During broadcast hours, KOAK simulcasts the FM sister station (KCSI) content.

External links

 KOAK/KCSI website

OAK
OAK